Milica Šterić (1914–1998) was a Serbian architect who worked at Energoprojekt for many years, founding and heading its architecture department. She is also responsible for many of the power plants built in Yugoslavia, which helped rebuild the country's economy after the Second World War. Known for her modernist approach, she is one of the first women in Serbia to undertake large scale architectural projects.

Career
Šterić was born in Smederevo, Serbia and studied architecture in Belgrade, graduating in 1937. Once World War 2 was over, she was hired by Elektroistok in 1947. She then worked at Energoprojekt from 1951 until 1985, where she became their chief architect. She initially focused on constructing industrial and infrastructural buildings for both companies, designing several power plants throughout Yugoslavia.

In 1957, Šterić spent half a year in the Netherlands working at the architectural firm Van den Broek and Bakeme where she learnt more about the Bauhaus style. After returning to Serbia, she applied her new skills and built a commercial building on Carice Milice 2 street. Constructed in 1957, the building's facade is a combination of steel and glass, underscored by horizontal bands of windows. Just down the road, Šterić also built the headquarters of Energoprojekt in 1960, which later became the Beobank building. It was the first structure in Belgrade with free standing pillars and a transparent glass facade.

Awards and honours
In 1984, Šterić received the "Grand prix d'architecture" from the "Union of Architects of Serbia". In 1994, she was a member of the committee that created the "Academy of Architecture of Serbia" the following year. In 2015, the "Belgrade International Architecture Week" festival organized a walking tour of Belgrade buildings that were constructed by women architects such as Šterić. That same year, she was one of several female pioneers reviewed in the book "Women in Architecture - Contemporary architecture in Serbia since 1900".

Šterić's Beobank building will be transformed into an eco-center sometime in 2018. Located in the Zeleni Venac neighbourhood, the structure won her the Sedmojulska nagrada (7th Prize award for architecture) when it was built.  In 2018, Šterić and other Yugoslav architects will be the focus of an exhibition at the New York Museum of Modern Art (MoMA) called "Towards Concrete Utopia: Architecture in Yugoslavia, 1948-1980".

References

External links
 http://aas.org.rs/steric-milica-biografija/

1914 births
1998 deaths
University of Belgrade alumni
Serbian architects
Women architects
Serbian women architects
Yugoslav architects
People from Smederevo